Stoke Park could refer to:
 Stoke Park, Bristol
 Stoke Park Hospital, Bristol
 Stoke Park House, Stoke Gifford
 Stoke Park, Buckinghamshire, an estate, now the Stoke Park Country Club, Spa & Hotel
 Stoke Park, Guildford
 Stoke Park, Suffolk
 Stoke Park, Wiltshire

See also:

 Stoke Park Pavilions, Northamptonshire
 Stoke Park School
 Stoke Park Wood, Stoke Rochford
 Stoke Park Woods, Bishopstoke
 Stokes National Park, Western Australia
 Stokes State Forest, New Jersey

pl:Stoke Park